{{DISPLAYTITLE:C3H8S2}}
The molecular formula C3H8S2 (molar mass: 108.23 g/mol) may refer to:

 2,4-Dithiapentane
 Propanedithiols
 1,2-Propanedithiol
 1,3-Propanedithiol

Molecular formulas